John Harmon may refer to:
John Harmon (actor) (1905–1985), American actor
John Harmon (attorney) (born 1944), United States Assistant Attorney General under President Jimmy Carter
John Harmon (coach), Boston University basketball and football coach
John Harmon (character), a character in Our Mutual Friend
John Harmon (Wisconsin politician) (1845–1921), American lumberman and politician.
John H. Harmon (1819–1888), mayor of Detroit and publisher of the Detroit Free Press